The Honda XL80S was a dual-sport motorcycle made by Honda for five years starting in 1980. All models had metal fuel tanks and used the same engine. The XL80S looks like a dirt bike, and shares many characteristics with a dirt bike, but it is street-legal and intended for on- and off-road use.

References

XL80S
Dual-sport motorcycles
Motorcycles introduced in 1980